Satakunta is one of the 13 electoral districts of the Parliament of Finland, the national legislature of Finland. The district was established as Turku and Pori North in 1907 when the Diet of Finland was replaced by the Parliament of Finland. It was renamed Satakunta in 1997. It is conterminous with the region of Satakunta. The district currently elects eight of the 200 members of the Parliament of Finland using the open party-list proportional representation electoral system. At the 2019 parliamentary election it had 181,239 registered electors.

History
Turku and Pori North was one 16 electoral districts established by the Election Act of the Grand Duchy of Finland (Suomen Suuriruhtinaanmaan Vaalilaki) passed by the Diet of Finland in 1906. It consisted of the hundreds (kihlakunta) of Ikaalinen, Loimaa, Tyrvää and Ulvila in the province of Turku and Pori. The town of Loimaa and the municipalities of Alastaro, Loimaa, Mellilä and Metsämaa were transferred from Turku North to Turku South in 1947. The municipalities of Hämeenkyrö, Ikaalinen, Kihniö, Mouhijärvi, Parkano and Viljakkala were transferred from Turku North to Häme North in 1993. The district was renamed Satakunta in 1997.

The municipalities of Äetsä, Suodenniemi and Vammala were transferred from Satakunta to Pirkanmaa in 1998. At the same time, Kodisjoki municipality was transferred from Varsinais-Suomi to Satakunta and Urjala municipality was transferred from Häme to Satakunta. Punkalaidun municipality was transferred from Satakunta to Pirkanmaa in 2005.

Electoral system
Satakunta currently elects eight of the 200 members of the Parliament of Finland using the open party-list proportional representation electoral system. Parties may form electoral alliances with each other to pool their votes and increase their chances of winning seats. However. the number of candidates nominated by an electoral alliance may not exceed the maximum number of candidates that a single party may nominate. Seats are allocated using the D'Hondt method.

Election results

Summary

(Figures in italics represent joint lists.)

Detailed

2010s

2019
Results of the 2019 parliamentary election held on 14 April 2019:

The following candidates were elected:
Laura Huhtasaari (PS), 12,991 votes; Eeva Kalli (Kesk), 6,717 votes; Krista Kiuru (SDP), 8,281 votes; Jari Koskela (PS), 4,324 votes; Matias Marttinen (SFP), 4,925 votes; Jari Myllykoski (Vas), 4,001 votes; Kristiina Salonen (SDP), 10,430 votes; and Heidi Viljanen (SDP), 2,169 votes.

2015
Results of the 2015 parliamentary election held on 19 April 2015:

The following candidates were elected:
Laura Huhtasaari (PS), 9,259 votes; Ari Jalonen (PS), 5,753 votes; Kauko Juhantalo (Kesk), 4,627 votes; Timo Kalli (Kesk), 4,215 votes; Krista Kiuru (SDP), 7,561 votes; Jaana Laitinen-Pesola (Kok), 3,483 votes; Jari Myllykoski (Vas), 4,175 votes; and Kristiina Salonen (SDP), 9,560 votes.

2011
Results of the 2011 parliamentary election held on 17 April 2011:

The following candidates were elected:
Sauli Ahvenjärvi (KD), 3,880 votes; Anne Holmlund (Kok), 3,952 votes; Ari Jalonen (PS), 6,721 votes; Anssi Joutsenlahti (PS), 6,583 votes; Timo Kalli (Kesk), 5,163 votes; Sampsa Kataja (Kok), 6,425 votes; Krista Kiuru (SDP), 7,786 votes; Jari Myllykoski (Vas), 3,321 votes; and Kristiina Salonen (SDP), 7,124 votes.

2000s

2007
Results of the 2007 parliamentary election held on 18 March 2007:

The following candidates were elected:
Anne Holmlund (Kok), 3,896 votes; Timo Kalli (Kesk), 5,836 votes; Reijo Kallio (SDP), 5,400 votes; Oiva Kaltiokumpu (Kesk), 5,611 votes; Sampsa Kataja (Kok), 8,463 votes; Krista Kiuru (SDP), 5,560 votes; Juha Korkeaoja (Kesk), 5,316 votes; Veijo Puhjo (Vas), 3,271 votes; and Antti Vuolanne (SDP), 5,182 votes.

2003
Results of the 2003 parliamentary election held on 16 March 2003:

The following candidates were elected:
Mikko Elo (SDP), 4,893 votes; Anne Holmlund (Kok), 3,701 votes; Kauko Juhantalo (Kesk), 8,484 votes; Timo Kalli (Kesk), 5,417 votes; Reijo Kallio (SDP), 6,283 votes; Juha Korkeaoja (Kesk), 5,820 votes; Kalevi Lamminen (Kok), 3,390 votes; Pirkko Peltomo (SDP), 6,736 votes; and Veijo Puhjo (Vas), 5,687 votes.

1990s

1999
Results of the 1999 parliamentary election held on 21 March 1999:

The following candidates were elected:
Mikko Elo (SDP), 8,268 votes; Olli-Pekka Heinonen (Kok), 11,697 votes; Leea Hiltunen (SKL), 4,697 votes; Timo Kalli (Kesk), 5,707 votes; Reijo Kallio (SDP), 7,128 votes; Juha Korkeaoja (Kesk), 6,588 votes; Jouni Lehtimäki (Kok), 4,117 votes; Pirkko Peltomo (SDP), 6,240 votes; Veijo Puhjo (Vas), 8,084 votes; and Katja Syvärinen (Vas), 4,423 votes.

1995
Results of the 1995 parliamentary election held on 19 March 1995:

The following candidates were elected:
Mikko Elo (SDP), 9,715 votes; Olli-Pekka Heinonen (Kok), 10,327 votes; Kauko Juhantalo (Kesk), 6,580 votes; Timo Kalli (Kesk), 5,086 votes; Reijo Kallio (SDP), 5,135 votes; Juha Korkeaoja (Kesk), 9,895 votes; Timo Laaksonen (Vas), 4,391 votes; Kalevi Lamminen (Kok), 4,515 votes; Pirkko Peltomo (SDP), 4,829 votes; Veijo Puhjo (Vas), 3,345 votes; and Heikki Rinne (SDP), 5,283 votes.

1991
Results of the 1991 parliamentary election held on 17 March 1991:

The following candidates were elected:
Raila Aho (Vas), 3,756 votes; Leea Hiltunen (SKL), 5,108 votes; Kauko Juhantalo (Kesk), 8,984 votes; Timo Kalli (Kesk), 6,777 votes; Maunu Kohijoki (Kok), 5,473 votes; Juha Korkeaoja (Kesk), 4,892 votes; Timo Laaksonen (Vas), 6,236 votes; Kalevi Lamminen (Kok), 5,335 votes; Lea Mäkipää (SMP), 6,049 votes; Heikki Rinne (SDP), 7,646 votes; Timo Roos (SDP), 6,646 votes; and Raimo Vuoristo (SDP), 6,518 votes.

1980s

1987
Results of the 1987 parliamentary election held on 15 and 16 March 1987:

The following candidates were elected:
Raila Aho (SKDL), 3,676 votes; Mikko Elo (SDP), 7,199 votes; Kauko Juhantalo (Kesk), 8,514 votes; Maunu Kohijoki (Kok), 7,600 votes; Timo Laaksonen (SKDL), 7,741 votes; Kalevi Lamminen (Kok), 4,952 votes; Lea Mäkipää (SMP), 5,808 votes; Einari Nieminen (Kesk), 6,160 votes; Aino Pohjanoksa (Kok), 6,084 votes; Heikki Rinne (SDP), 4,445 votes; Timo Roos (SDP), 6,371 votes; and Raimo Vuoristo (SDP), 6,301 votes.

1983
Results of the 1983 parliamentary election held on 20 and 21 March 1983:

The following candidates were elected:
Mikko Elo (SDP), 7,692 votes; Aila Jokinen (Kok), 5,626 votes; Anssi Joutsenlahti (SMP), 16,210 votes; Kauko Juhantalo (Kesk-LKP), 5,970 votes; Matti Kuusio (SDP), 4,200 votes; Timo Laaksonen (SKDL), 8,198 votes; Lea Mäkipää (SMP), 1,621 votes; Einari Nieminen (Kesk-LKP), 7,083 votes; Toivo Topias Pohjala (Kok), 5,748 votes; Aino Pohjanoksa (Kok), 7,566 votes; Timo Roos (SDP), 4,337 votes; Irma Rosnell (SKDL), 5,682 votes; and Pirkko Työläjärvi (SDP), 16,734 votes.

1970s

1979
Results of the 1979 parliamentary election held on 18 and 19 March 1979:

The following candidates were elected:
Mikko Elo (SDP), 6,132 votes; Matti Järvenpää (SKDL), 5,582 votes; Aila Jokinen (Kok), 6,475 votes; Anssi Joutsenlahti (SMP), 9,885 votes; Kauko Juhantalo (Kesk), 6,580 votes; Aulis Juvela (SKDL), 6,377 votes; Anneli Kivitie (LKP), 7,170 votes; Einari Nieminen (Kesk), 7,197 votes; Matti Pelttari (Kok), 8,431 votes; Toivo Topias Pohjala (Kok), 5,836 votes; Irma Rosnell (SKDL), 7,778 votes; Pirkko Työläjärvi (SDP), 14,720 votes; and Pirkko Valtonen (SDP), 6,004 votes.

1975
Results of the 1975 parliamentary election held on 21 and 22 September 1975:

The following candidates were elected:
Saimi Ääri (Kesk), 6,946 votes; Kirsti Hollming (Kok), 6,605 votes; Matti Järvenpää (SKDL), 7,078 votes; Tuure Junnila (Kok), 6,356 votes; Aulis Juvela (SKDL), 6,610 votes; Anneli Kivitie (LKP), 7,753 votes; Matti Kuusio (SDP), 5,438 votes; Uljas Mäkelä (SDP), 6,476 votes; Einari Nieminen (Kesk), 6,336 votes; Toivo Topias Pohjala (Kok), 6,344 votes; Pentti Rajala (SDP), 5,791 votes; Irma Rosnell (SKDL), 10,397 votes; and Pirkko Työläjärvi (SDP), 9,043 votes.

1972
Results of the 1972 parliamentary election held on 2 and 3 January 1972:

The following candidates were elected:
Saimi Ääri (Kesk), 6,127 votes; Pentti Antila (SMP), 4,743 votes; Margit Eskman (SDP), 10,654 votes; Matti Järvenpää (SKDL), 5,574 votes; Tuure Junnila (Kok), 4,402 votes; Aulis Juvela (SKDL), 5,547 votes; Uljas Mäkelä (SDP), 6,734 votes; Einari Nieminen (Kesk), 5,765 votes; Irma Rosnell (SKDL), 10,306 votes; Aulis Sileäkangas (Kesk), 6,159 votes; Ilkka Suominen (Kok), 9,052 votes; Pirkko Työläjärvi (SDP), 4,736 votes; and Väinö Vilponiemi (SDP), 8,191 votes.

1970
Results of the 1970 parliamentary election held on 15 and 16 March 1970:

The following candidates were elected:
Saimi Ääri (Kesk), 5,145 votes; Pentti Antila (SMP), 3,680 votes; Margit Eskman (SDP), 9,802 votes; Matti Järvenpää (SKDL), 4,542 votes; Tuure Junnila (Kok), 5,493 votes; Aulis Juvela (SKDL), 4,826 votes; Nestori Kaasalainen (Kesk), 6,023 votes; Eeles Landström (LKP), 5,123 votes; Uljas Mäkelä (SDP), 7,786 votes; Antti-Veikko Perheentupa (SDP), 5,951 votes; Irma Rosnell (SKDL), 6,747 votes; Ilkka Suominen (Kok), 8,377 votes; and Väinö Vilponiemi (SDP), 6,495 votes.

1960s

1966
Results of the 1966 parliamentary election held on 20 and 21 March 1966:

The following candidates were elected:
Margit Eskman (SDP), 5,746 votes; Kelpo Gröndahl (SKDL), 4,988 votes; Tuure Junnila (Kok), 6,196 votes; Aulis Juvela (SKDL), 4,816 votes; Nestori Kaasalainen (Kesk), 7,065 votes; Eeles Landström (LKP), 4,061 votes; Uljas Mäkelä (SDP), 9,557 votes; Arvo Pentti (Kesk), 7,520 votes; Antti-Veikko Perheentupa (SDP), 6,409 votes; Matti Raipala (Kok), 4,195 votes; Irma Rosnell (SKDL), 7,588 votes; Aulis Sileäkangas (Kesk), 6,210 votes; and Väinö Vilponiemi (SDP), 9,220 votes.

1962
Results of the 1962 parliamentary election held on 4 and 5 February 1962:

The following candidates were elected:
Kelpo Gröndahl (SKDL), 5,476 votes; Einari Jaakkola (ML), 7,249 votes; Nestori Kaasalainen (ML), 5,729 votes; Olavi Lindblom (SDP), 4,718 votes; Juho Mäkelä (SKDL), 3,984 votes; Uljas Mäkelä (SDP), 3,998 votes; Arvo Pentti (ML), 5,420 votes; Matti Raipala (Kok), 4,540 votes; Pertti Rapio (SKDL), 4,784 votes; Paavo Rautkallio (Kok), 4,112 votes; Irma Rosnell (SKDL), 8,807 votes; Erkki Ryömä (ML), 6,091 votes; Aapo Seppälä (Kok), 4,025 votes; and Väinö Vilponiemi (SDP), 3,699 votes.

1950s

1958
Results of the 1958 parliamentary election held on 6 and 7 July 1958:

The following candidates were elected:
Einari Jaakkola (ML), 5,152 votes; Tuure Junnila (Kok), 5,716 votes; Nestori Kaasalainen (ML), 3,917 votes; Olavi Lindblom (SDP), 4,255 votes; Pentti Niemi (SDP), 5,701 votes; Arvo Pentti (ML), 3,762 votes; Kyllikki Pohjala (Kok), 4,374 votes; Antto Prunnila (SKDL), 3,646 votes; Matti Raipala (Kok), 4,466 votes; Viljo Rantala (SDP), 4,093 votes; Pertti Rapio (SKDL), 4,234 votes; Irma Rosnell (SKDL), 5,908 votes; Mauri Ryömä (SKDL), 4,920 votes; and Arvo Sävelä (SDP), 4,681 votes.

1954
Results of the 1954 parliamentary election held on 7 and 8 March 1954:

The following candidates were elected:
Laura Brander-Wallin (SDP); Eino Heikura (ML); Einari Jaakkola (ML); Tuure Junnila (Kok); Nestori Kaasalainen (ML); Olavi Lindblom (SDP); Lauri Murtomaa (ML); Kyllikki Pohjala (Kok); Matti Raipala (Kok); Viljo Rantala (SDP); Pertti Rapio (SKDL); Irma Rosnell (SKDL); Mauri Ryömä (SKDL); and Arvo Sävelä (SDP).

1951
Results of the 1951 parliamentary election held on 1 and 2 July 1951:

The following candidates were elected:
Laura Brander-Wallin (SDP); Eino Heikura (ML); Kalle Joukanen (ML); Tuure Junnila (Kok); Nestori Kaasalainen (ML); Lauri Murtomaa (ML); Pentti Niemi (SDP); Hugo Nuorsaari (Kok); Kyllikki Pohjala (Kok); Antto Prunnila (SKDL); Viljo Rantala (SDP); Pertti Rapio (SKDL); Arvo Riihimäki (SKDL); Arvo Sävelä (SDP); and Irma Torvi (SKDL).

1940s

1948
Results of the 1948 parliamentary election held on 1 and 2 July 1948:

The following candidates were elected:
Laura Brander-Wallin (SDP); Kalle Joukanen (ML); Lauri Kaukamaa (Kok); Lauri Leppihalme (ML); Lauri Murtomaa (ML); Pentti Niemi (SDP); Hugo Nuorsaari (Kok); Kyllikki Pohjala (Kok); Antto Prunnila (SKDL); Viljo Rantala (SDP); Arvo Riihimäki (SKDL); Arvo Sävelä (SDP); and Irma Torvi (SKDL).

1945
Results of the 1945 parliamentary election held on 17 and 18 March 1945:

The following candidates were elected:
Anshelm Alestalo (ML); Yrjö Kallinen (SDP); Kalle Kirra (ML); Walter Kuusela (SDP); Ensio Kytömaa (KE); Juho Mäkelä (SKDL); Lauri Murtomaa (ML); Kyllikki Pohjala (Kok); Antto Prunnila (SKDL); Viljo Rantala (SDP); Arvo Riihimäki (SKDL); Miina Sillanpää (SDP); Olga Virtanen (SKDL); and Matti Ytti (Kok).

1930s

1939
Results of the 1939 parliamentary election held on 1 and 2 July 1939:

The following candidates were elected:
Paavo Aarniokoski (SDP); Kalle Joukanen (ML); Kaarlo Kares (IKL); Kalle Kirra (ML); Ville Komu (SDP); Kustaa Kylänpää (Kok); J. E. Malmivuori (SDP); Lauri Murtomaa (ML); Frans Mustasilta (SDP); Kyllikki Pohjala (Kok); Viljo Rantala (SDP); Miina Sillanpää (SDP); Kalle Soini (Kok); and Väinö Tanner (SDP).

1936
Results of the 1936 parliamentary election held on 1 and 2 July 1936:

The following candidates were elected:
Paavo Aarniokoski (SDP); Anshelm Alestalo (ML); Kalle Joukanen (ML); Arvi Jovero (SDP); Kaarlo Kares (IKL); Kalle Kirra (ML); Ville Komu (SDP); Kustaa Kylänpää (Kok); Antti Lastu (SDP); Frans Mustasilta (SDP); Kyllikki Pohjala (Kok); Viljo Rantala (SDP); Miina Sillanpää (SDP); Kalle Soini (Kok); and Väinö Tanner (SDP).

1933
Results of the 1933 parliamentary election held on 1, 2 and 3 July 1933:

The following candidates were elected:
Eemeli Aakula (ML); Paavo Aarniokoski (SDTP); Anshelm Alestalo (ML); K. J. Ellilä (ML); Taave Junnila (Kok-IKL); Ville Komu (SDTP); Antti Lastu (SDTP); J. E. Malmivuori (SDTP); Frans Mustasilta (SDTP); Niilo Pajunen (SDTP); Kyllikki Pohjala (Kok-IKL); Viljo Rantala (SDTP); Kalle Soini (Kok-IKL); Arne Somersalo (Kok-IKL); and Väinö Tanner (SDTP).

1930
Results of the 1930 parliamentary election held on 1 and 2 October 1930:

The following candidates were elected:
Eemeli Aakula (ML); Toivo Aalto-Setälä (Kok); Fanny Ahlfors (SDTP); Anshelm Alestalo (ML); Emanuel Aromaa (SDTP); Kaarlo Huhtala (Kok); Kalle Joukanen (ML); Taave Junnila (Kok); Ville Komu (SDTP); Antero Lamminen (Kok); Walter Mäkelä (ML); Viljo Rantala (SDTP); Miina Sillanpää (SDTP); Kaarlo Sovijärvi (Kok); and Väinö Tanner (SDTP).

1920s

1929
Results of the 1929 parliamentary election held on 1 and 2 July 1929:

The following candidates were elected:
Anshelm Alestalo (ML); Emanuel Aromaa (SDTP); K. J. Ellilä (ML); Taave Junnila (Kok); Kalle Kirra (ML); Ville Komu (SDTP); Antero Lamminen (Kok); Jalmari Leino (SDTP); Aina Lähteenoja (Kok); Walter Mäkelä (ML); Väinö Pohjaranta (STPV); Viljo Rantala (SDTP); Arvo Riihimäki (STPV); Hannes Ryömä (SDTP); and Miina Sillanpää (SDTP).

1927
Results of the 1927 parliamentary election held on 1 and 2 July 1927:

The following candidates were elected:
Toivo Aalto-Setälä (Kok); Anshelm Alestalo (ML); Jussi Fahler (SDTP); Frans Härmä (Kok); Taave Junnila (Kok); Kalle Kirra (ML); Ville Komu (SDTP); Kustaa Kylänpää (Kok); Jalmari Leino (SDTP); Walter Mäkelä (ML); Viljo Rantala (SDTP); Arvo Riihimäki (STPV); Hannes Ryömä (SDTP); Miina Sillanpää (SDTP); and Walto Tuomioja (KE).

1924
Results of the 1924 parliamentary election held on 1 and 2 April 1924:

The following candidates were elected:
Fanny Ahlfors (SDTP); Anshelm Alestalo (ML); Emanuel Aromaa (SDTP); Frans Härmä (Kok); Eino Heikura (ML); Lauri Ingman (Kok); Taave Junnila (Kok); Kalle Kirra (ML); Frans Mustasilta (SDTP); Viljo Rantala (SDTP); Miina Sillanpää (SDTP); Anshelm Sjöstedt-Jussila (Kok); Väinö Tanner (SDTP); Walto Tuomioja (KE); and Svantte Vuorio (STPV).

1922
Results of the 1922 parliamentary election held on 1, 2 and 3 July 1922:

The following candidates were elected:
Fanny Ahlfors (SDTP); J. O. Aromaa (SDTP); Toivo Aronen (SSTP); Frans Härmä (Kok); Lauri Ingman (Kok); Taave Junnila (Kok); Kalle Kirra (ML); Vilho Korhonen (SDTP); Kustaa Kylänpää (Kok); Viljo Rantala (SDTP); Risto Ryti (KE); Miina Sillanpää (SDTP); Väinö Tanner (SDTP); Juho Vesterlund (SSTP); and Bjarne Westermarck (ML).

1910s

1919
Results of the 1919 parliamentary election held on 1, 2 and 3 March 1919:

The following candidates were elected:
Fanny Ahlfors (SDTP); Ivar Alanen (Kok); Mikko Collan (KE); Kalle Fredrik Hakala (SDTP); Ilmi Hallsten (Kok); Edvard Hannula (Kok); Juho Kekkonen (KrTL); Vilho Korhonen (SDTP); Oskari Leivo (SDTP); Toivo Rintala (SDTP); Risto Ryti (KE); Wäinö Selander (ML); Eemil Nestor Setälä (Kok); Miina Sillanpää (SDTP); and Väinö Tanner (SDTP).

1917
Results of the 1917 parliamentary election held on 1 and 2 October 1917:

The following candidates were elected:
Ivar Alanen (SP-NP-KP); Emanuel Aromaa (SDP); Nestori Aronen (SDP); Aino Forsten (SDP); Edvard Gylling (SDP); Kyösti Haataja (SP-NP-KP); Juho Hakkinen (SDP); Lauri Ingman (SP-NP-KP); Juho Lautasalo (SDP); Jussi Puumala (SP-NP-KP); Albert Raitanen (SDP); Frans Rantanen (SDP); Eetu Salin (SDP); Eemil Nestor Setälä (SP-NP-KP); and Anshelm Sjöstedt-Jussila (SP-NP-KP).

1916
Results of the 1916 parliamentary election held on 1 and 3 July 1916:

The following candidates were elected:
Emanuel Aromaa (SDP); Nestori Aronen (SDP); Aino Forsten (SDP); Edvard Gylling (SDP); Kyösti Haataja (SP); Lucina Hagman (NP); Juho Hakkinen (SDP); Lauri Ingman (SP); Juho Lautasalo (SDP); Oskari Leivo (SDP); Sulho Leppä (SDP); Frans Oskar Lilius (NP); Otto Peitsalo (SDP); Albert Raitanen (SDP); Frans Rantanen (SDP); Miina Sillanpää (SDP); and Anshelm Sjöstedt-Jussila (SP).

1913
Results of the 1913 parliamentary election held on 1 and 2 August 1913:

The following candidates were elected:
Emanuel Aromaa (SDP); Nestori Aronen (SDP); Reinhold Grönvall (SP); Edvard Gylling (SDP); Lauri Ingman (SP); Mimmi Kanervo (SDP); Mikko Latva (NP); Juho Lautasalo (SDP); Oskari Leivo (SDP); Frans Oskar Lilius (NP); Frans Mustasilta (SDP); Frans Rantanen (SDP); Iisakki Saha (SP); Miina Sillanpää (SDP); Anshelm Sjöstedt-Jussila (SP); Väinö Tanner (SDP); and Kalle Vänniä (SP).

1911
Results of the 1911 parliamentary election held on 2 and 3 January 1911:

The following candidates were elected:
Emanuel Aromaa (SDP); Nestori Aronen (SDP); Reinhold Grönvall (SP); Edvard Gylling (SDP); Edvard Hannula (NP); Lauri Ingman (SP); Taave Junnila (SP); Mimmi Kanervo (SDP); J. F. Kivikoski (SDP); Wilho Laine (SDP); Juho Lautasalo (SDP); Oskari Leivo (SDP); Frans Oskar Lilius (NP); Juho Kusti Paasikivi (SP); Jussi Rainio (SDP); Frans Rantanen (SDP); and  Anshelm Sjöstedt-Jussila (SP).

1910
Results of the 1910 parliamentary election held on 1 and 2 February 1910:

The following candidates were elected:
Emanuel Aromaa (SDP); Nestori Aronen (SDP); Reinhold Grönvall (SP); Edvard Gylling (SDP); Edvard Hannula (NP); Lauri Ingman (SP); Taave Junnila (SP); Mimmi Kanervo (SDP); J. F. Kivikoski (SDP); Wilho Laine (SDP); Juho Lautasalo (SDP); Oskari Leivo (SDP); Frans Oskar Lilius (NP); Juho Kusti Paasikivi (SP); Jussi Rainio (SDP); Frans Rantanen (SDP); and Anshelm Sjöstedt-Jussila (SP).

1900s

1909
Results of the 1909 parliamentary election held on 1 and 3 May 1909:

The following candidates were elected:
Emanuel Aromaa (SDP); Nestori Aronen (SDP); Jonas Castrén (NP); Edvard Gylling (SDP); Edvard Hannula (NP); Lauri Ingman (SP); Taave Junnila (SP); Antti Kaarne (KrTL); Mimmi Kanervo (SDP); Frans Koskinen (SDP); Juho Lautasalo (SDP); Oskari Leivo (SDP); Väinö Nyström (SP); Frans Rapola (SP); Eetu Salin (SDP); Juho Seppä-Murto (SP); and Väinö Tanner (SDP).

1908
Results of the 1908 parliamentary election held on 1 and 2 July 1908:

The following candidates were elected:
Emanuel Aromaa (SDP); Edvard Gylling (SDP); Lauri Ingman (SP); Taave Junnila (SP); Antti Kaarne (KrTL); Mimmi Kanervo (SDP); Vilho Korhonen (SDP); Frans Koskinen (SDP); Mikko Latva (NP); Juho Lautasalo (SDP); Oskari Leivo (SDP); Juho Kusti Paasikivi (SP); Frans Rapola (SP); Frans Rantanen (SDP); Eemil Nestor Setälä (NP); Väinö Tanner (SDP); and Iida Vemmelpuu (SP).

1907
Results of the 1907 parliamentary election held on 15 and 16 March 1907:

The following candidates were elected:
Emanuel Aromaa (SDP); Emil Helkiö (SP); Lauri Ingman (SP); Taavetti Kalliokorpi (SDP); Mimmi Kanervo (SDP); Frans Koskinen (SDP); Wilho Laine (SDP); Oskari Leivo (SDP); J. R. Merinen (SDP); Matti Merivirta (KrTL); Juho Kusti Paasikivi (SP); Frans Rantanen (SDP); Frans Rapola (SP); Kalle Salminen (SDP); Eemil Nestor Setälä (NP); Väinö Tanner (SDP); and Iida Vemmelpuu (SP).

Notes

References

1907 establishments in Finland
Constituencies established in 1907
Parliament of Finland electoral districts
parliamentary electoral district